Mind Games is the second studio album by American post-hardcore band Palisades. The album was released on January 13, 2015, by Rise Records. It debuted at number 81 on the Billboard 200, number 2 on the Heatseekers chart, number 5 on the Hard Rock Albums chart, number 17 on the Top Rock Albums, and number 59 on the Digital Albums chart.

Track listing

Personnel
Palisades
 Louis Miceli - lead vocals, unclean vocals
 Xavier Adames - lead guitar, backing vocals
 Matthew Marshall - rhythm guitar, additional unclean vocals
 Earl Halasan - turntables, keyboards, synthesizer, programming
 Brandon Sidney - bass guitar, backing vocals, co-lead vocals
 Aaron Rosa - drums, percussionProduction
 Erik Ron - Producer
 Pete Rutcho - mixing, mastering, engineer

Charts

References
 

2015 albums
Palisades (band) albums
Rise Records albums